We Young is the first EP of South Korean boy band NCT Dream, the third sub-unit of the South Korean boy band NCT. It was released by S.M. Entertainment on August 17, 2017 and distributed by Genie Music. The mini-album includes a total of six tracks. This was the second and final album release not to include Jaemin due to his medical hiatus.

Concept 
The lead single,  "We Young" is an up-tempo dance number of tropical house genre. The album contains five other songs, "La La Love", "Walk You Home", "My Page", "Trigger the Fever", and the Chinese version of "We Young" which revolves around the theme of young love and other problems teens face.

Promotion 
NCT Dream held their comeback showcase today on August 16, 2017 at Gyeonggi-do Ilsan Hyundai Motor Studio Goyang; where they held their first stage of the title song "We Young". The unit had their first comeback stage on M Countdown.

Track listing

Charts

Weekly charts

Release history

References

External links 
 "We Young" music video

2017 debut EPs
SM Entertainment EPs
Korean-language EPs
Dance-pop EPs
Genie Music EPs
NCT Dream albums